Jack Hardy (born 26 March 1999, in Australia) is an Australian rugby union player who plays for the Queensland Reds in Super Rugby. His playing position is fullback. He has signed to play for the Reds in 2019.

Reference list

External links
Rugby.com.au profile
itsrugby.co.uk profile

1999 births
Australian rugby union players
Living people
Rugby union fullbacks
Western Force players
Queensland Reds players